In computational complexity theory, R is the class of decision problems solvable by a Turing machine, which is the set of all recursive languages (also called decidable languages).

Equivalent formulations
R is equivalent to the set of all total computable functions in the sense that:
a decision problem is in R if and only if its indicator function is computable,
a total function is computable if and only if its graph is in R.

Relationship with other classes
Since we can decide any problem for which there exists a recogniser and also a co-recogniser by simply interleaving them until one obtains a result, the class is equal to RE ∩ co-RE.

References
Blum, Lenore, Mike Shub, and Steve Smale, (1989), "On a theory of computation and complexity over the real numbers: NP-completeness, recursive functions and universal machines", Bulletin of the American Mathematical Society, New Series, 21 (1): 1-46.

External links

Complexity classes